Jeannette Chong-Aruldoss is a Singaporean lawyer and politician. She started her political career by joining the opposition Reform Party in 2009, but left in 2011 to join another opposition party, the National Solidarity Party (NSP). During the 2011 general election, she contested as a NSP candidate in Mountbatten SMC but lost to the People's Action Party (PAP) candidate Lim Biow Chuan after getting 41.38% of the vote. From October 2013 to January 2015, she served as the NSP's secretary-general before leaving to join another opposition party, the Singapore People's Party (SPP). She contested in Mountbatten SMC again during the 2015 general election as a SPP candidate, but lost to the PAP's Lim Biow Chuan again, garnering just 28.14% of the vote. She left the SPP in 2019 and was seen accompanying Workers' Party members on a walkabout in Marine Parade GRC.

Education
Chong-Aruldoss was educated at CHIJ Katong Convent before she read law at the University of Kent at Canterbury and completed a Bachelor of Laws (honours) in 1985. In 1987, she completed a Master of Laws in corporate and commercial law at the London School of Economics.

Legal career
Chong-Aruldoss qualified as a barrister-at-law at Gray's Inn in 1986 and became an advocate and solicitor in Singapore in 1989. She began her legal career at Allen & Gledhill LLP. In 2001, she co-founded Archilex Law Corporation, a founding member of Mozaic Group Law Practice. She is currently a consultant at Robert Wang & Woo LLP and an accredited mediator at the Singapore Mediation Centre.

Political career

Reform Party
Chong-Aruldoss entered politics in 2009 and eventually became a member of the opposition Reform Party's central executive committee. She left the Reform Party on 18 February 2011 due to "differences of opinion".

National Solidarity Party
In 2011, Chong-Aruldoss joined another opposition party, the National Solidarity Party (NSP), and stood for election as a NSP candidate during the general election that year as a NSP candidate in Mountbatten SMC. However, she lost to Lim Biow Chuan, the candidate from the governing People's Action Party (PAP), after getting 41.38% of the vote against Lim's 58.62%.

On 27 October 2013, Chong-Aruldoss was elected the secretary-general of the NSP following the resignation of her predecessor, Hazel Poa.

In January 2015, Chong-Aruldoss challenged Sebastian Teo for the position of president of the NSP but was voted out of the NSP's central executive committee.

Singapore People's Party
Chong-Aruldoss eventually left the NSP and joined another opposition party, the Singapore People's Party (SPP), in April 2015. In the general election that year, she contested as a SPP candidate in Mountbatten SMC, but lost to the PAP's Lim Biow Chuan again, garnering just 28.14% of the vote against Lim's 71.86%.

Leaving the Singapore People's Party
On 2 September 2019, Chong-Aruldoss resigned from the SPP. In a Facebook post announcing her resignation, she said, "I entered politics in 2009 because I was convinced that the PAP held too much power and I was worried for Singaporeans. I felt that we desperately needed more opposition in Parliament to redress the imbalance." Two days later, she told The Independent Singapore in an interview that she had no plans to join another political party.

In October 2019, Chong-Aruldoss was seen accompanying Workers' Party members on a walkabout in the Eunos Crescent area of Marine Parade GRC.

2017 assault case
On 8 August 2017, Chong-Aruldoss sustained a bruised hip after she was assaulted by fellow lawyer and opposition politician M Ravi at The Adelphi. Court documents revealed that Ravi had gone to The Adelphi and demanded to be allowed inside Eugene Thuraisingam's law firm, where Chong-Aruldoss was working then. He had stopped her abruptly and began questioning her aggressively. When she tried to walk away, he forcefully pushed her twice, causing her to stumble backwards and fall onto the ground. After she was down, he kicked and flung her belongings scattered on the ground, and also threw a shoe in her direction while mocking her for being 'drama'. On 5 January 2018, in lieu of a jail term, Ravi was ordered to undergo an 18-month mandatory treatment for his bipolar disorder, which had led to him committing the offence, among others.

References

Living people
Singapore People's Party politicians
National Solidarity Party (Singapore) politicians
Reform Party (Singapore) politicians
Singaporean women in politics
Singaporean people of Hakka descent
Alumni of the London School of Economics
Alumni of the University of Kent
Singaporean women lawyers
20th-century Singaporean lawyers
21st-century Singaporean lawyers
20th-century women lawyers
21st-century women lawyers
Year of birth missing (living people)